15th National Board of Review Awards
December 23, 1943
The 15th National Board of Review Awards were announced on 23 December 1943.

Best English Language Films
The Ox-Bow Incident
Watch on the Rhine
Air Force
Holy Matrimony
The Hard Way
Casablanca
Lassie Come Home
Bataan
The Moon Is Down
Next of Kin

Winners
Best Actors:
Paul Lukas - Watch on the Rhine
Harry Morgan - Happy Land and The Ox-Bow Incident
Cedric Hardwicke - The Cross of Lorraine and The Moon Is Down 
Best Actresses:
Gracie Fields - Holy Matrimony
Katina Paxinou - For Whom the Bell Tolls
Teresa Wright - Shadow of a Doubt
Best Directors:
Michael Curtiz - Casablanca and This Is the Army
Tay Garnett - Bataan and The Cross of Lorraine
William Wellman - The Ox-Bow Incident
Best English Language Film: The Ox-Bow Incident

External links
National Board of Review of Motion Pictures :: Awards for 1943

1943
1943 film awards
1943 in American cinema